Garland Waller is an assistant professor at Boston University in the College of Communications Department of Television and Film and a documentary film producer. She began making documentaries while working at WBZ-TV in the 1980s, including "Rape: An Act of Hate" narrated and hosted by Veronica Hamel.

Her first independent documentary was Small Justice: Little Justice in America's Family Courts on the subject of child and family courts.

Her second feature-length documentary, No Way Out But One, tells the story of Holly Collins, the first American to be granted asylum by the government of the Netherlands as a result of domestic violence. "No Way Out But One" won the Distinguished Service Award for Excellence in the Media from IVAT, an Accolade Award of Excellence  and a Telly Award, and an Indie Award of Merit.

In 2018, she produced and released "The Silent Soldier and the Portrait," a documentary inspired by her 95 year old father that tells one veteran's story of surviving little-known WWII tragedy and of his personal journey to set things right. The film won numerous awards and honors and was an official selection of Hague Global Film Festival. Boston based Film and Television Critic Joyce Kulhawik called it "An exquisitely intimate tale of war, redemption, and family seen through the eyes of a filmmaker who helped her dad lay his ghosts to rest. As it unfolds, Waller’s film holds us gently in the sweep of our own personal histories as we each make our peace."

Waller appears in the documentary film Seeking Happily Ever After. She is a public speaker on the subject of domestic violence. She has presented to the National Coalition Against Domestic Violence, the Battered Mothers Custody Conference, the National Alliance of Professional Psychology Providers, the Campaign for Commercial-Free Childhood Summit and the Domestic Violence and Child Custody Forum in New Jersey. She is the co-author of "Drawing Angels Near", a children's book, contributed an essay to "Disorder in the Courts" and a chapter titled: "The Yuck Factor, The Oprah Factor, and the 'Stickness' Factor Why the Mainstream Media Hasn't Covered Family Court Injustice" for the reference book Domestic Violence, Abuse, and Child Custody: Legal Strategies and Policy Issues.

She received her BS from the University of Virginia and her MS from Boston University.

References

Year of birth missing (living people)
Living people
American documentary filmmakers